The red-breasted merganser (Mergus serrator) is a diving duck, one of the sawbills. The genus name is a Latin word used by Pliny and other Roman authors to refer to an unspecified waterbird, and serrator is a sawyer from Latin serra, "saw".
The red-breasted merganser was one of the many bird species originally described by Carl Linnaeus in his landmark 1758 10th edition of Systema Naturae, where it was given the binomial name Mergus serrator.

Description

It has a spiky crest and long thin red bill with serrated edges. The male has a dark head with a green sheen, a white neck with a rusty breast, a black back, and white underparts. Adult females have a rusty head and a grayish body. Juveniles look similar to females, but lack the white collar and have smaller white wing patches.

Voice
The call of the female is a rasping prrak prrak, while the male gives a feeble hiccup-and-sneeze display call.

Behaviour

Food and feeding
Red-breasted mergansers dive and swim underwater. They mainly eat small fish, but also aquatic insects, crustaceans, and frogs.

Breeding
Its breeding habitat is freshwater lakes and rivers across northern North America, Greenland, Europe, and the Palearctic. It nests in sheltered locations on the ground near water. It is migratory and many northern breeders winter in coastal waters further south.

Speed record
The fastest duck ever recorded was a red-breasted merganser that attained a top airspeed of 100 mph while being pursued by an airplane. This eclipsed the previous speed record held by a canvasback clocked at 72 mph.

Conservation
The red-breasted merganser is one of the species to which the Agreement on the Conservation of African-Eurasian Migratory Waterbirds (AEWA) applies.

Gallery

References

External links

 Red-breasted Merganser Species Account – Cornell Lab of Ornithology
 Massachusetts Breeding Bird Atlas - Red-breasted Merganser
 
 

red-breasted merganser
Mergansers
Holarctic birds
Birds of Scandinavia
Birds of Iceland
Birds of Europe
red-breasted merganser
red-breasted merganser
Extant Pleistocene first appearances